Robert Brugère (21 October 1903 – 6 September 1933) was a French racing cyclist. He rode in the 1928 Tour de France.

References

1903 births
1933 deaths
French male cyclists
Place of birth missing